Chamas is an Arabic language surname. Notable people with the surname include:
 Mohamad Chamas, Lebanese actor
 Samir Chamas (born 1942), Lebanese actor, writer, journalist and voice actor

References 

Arabic-language surnames
Surnames of Lebanese origin